The Northern Berber languages are a dialect continuum spoken across the Maghreb, constituting a subgroup of the Berber branch of the Afroasiatic family. Their continuity has been broken by the spread of Arabic, and to a lesser extent by the Zenati group of Northern Berber. The Zenati idioms share certain innovations not found in the surrounding languages; notably a softening of k to sh and an absence of a- in certain words, such as "hand" (afus vs. fus.) 

Northern Berber languages spoken by over ten million people include Shilha, Central Morocco Tamazight, Riff, Shawiya and Kabyle. They fall into three groups:

Moroccan Atlas languages (incl. Shilha, Central Morocco Tamazight)
Zenati languages (incl. Riff, Shawiya)
Kabyle

The eastern boundaries of the North Berber varieties are uncertain. Some linguists include the Nafusi and Ghadames languages, while others do not. Most regard Ghadamès as lying outside of Northern Berber, but the Ethnologue does not.

There is no authoritative answer as to whether the Northern Berber varieties constitute languages rather than dialects. Some academics believe that not only Northern Berber but all the Berber languages are dialects of a single language, whereas others come up with much higher counts. At any rate, mutual comprehensibility among the Northern Berber varieties is high, though not perfect.

References

Northern Berber languages
Berber languages
Berbers in Algeria
Berbers in Morocco
Berbers in Tunisia
Languages of Morocco
Languages of Algeria
Languages of Tunisia
Languages of Libya